Located in South Mountain Park in Phoenix, Arizona, Scorpion Gulch was built as a home and store by William Lunsford.  Lunsford's store sold curios, Indigenous-made items, sodas, and candy.  It was still in operation in 1966, when Lunsford was 75.  In the 1970s, it became a bar.  According to the Phoenix Historic Property Register, Scorpion Gulch was built in 1936, and was first listed on the historic preservation register in October 1990. Historical photographs show a sign on the original building entitled, "South Mountain Trading Post", under which jewelry, Indian curios, and leather goods are advertised.

Scorpion Gulch today
Today, Scorpion Gulch, and its neighboring building are open to the public. Located at 10225 S. Central Ave, Scorpion Gulch is easily accessible and visible while driving South Central Avenue toward South Mountain. The roofs of both buildings are almost all but entirely gone, either for safety, or nature's toll. It is rumored that the building was burned at one point in its history; however, this is not evident by looking at either of the buildings themselves.

Reconstruction
The city of Phoenix Parks and Recreation Department began "stabilization" work on Scorpion Gulch and the building surrounding it in November 2012. The work was scheduled to be completed in February 2013. The roof of the building labeled, Scorpion Gulch" has been removed, and the wood window frames of the various structures has been replaced.

Gallery

See also

List of historic properties in Phoenix, Arizona
Phoenix Historic Property Register

References

External links 
 Scorpion Gulch Photo Pool on Flickr
 Pictures, maps and information about Scorpion Gulch

Buildings and structures in Phoenix, Arizona
Tourist attractions in Phoenix, Arizona